Nykaa is an Indian e-commerce company, founded by Falguni Nayar in 2012 and headquartered in Mumbai. It sells beauty, wellness and fashion products across websites, mobile apps and 100+ offline stores. In 2020, it became the first Indian unicorn startup headed by a woman.

Nykaa sells products which are manufactured in India as well as internationally. In 2015, the company expanded from online-only to an omnichannel model and began selling products apart from beauty. As of 2020, it retails over 2,000 brands and 200,000 products across its platforms.

History

In April 2012, Falguni Nayar, a former managing director at Kotak Mahindra Capital Company, founded Nykaa as an ecommerce portal curating a range of beauty and wellness products. The brand name Nykaa is derived from the Sanskrit word nayaka, meaning actress or "one in the spotlight". The website was first launched around Diwali 2012, and was available commercially in 2013.

In 2015, the company expanded from online-only to an omnichannel model and began selling fashion products.

In 2018, Nykaa launched Nykaa PRO. It is a premium membership program that provides users special access to professional beauty products and offers on the Nykaa app. In 2018, the company also launched an online beauty forum called Nykaa Network.

In March 2020, Nykaa raised  from Steadview Capital at a valuation of 1.2 billion, making it a unicorn startup. This was followed by another tranche of  funding by Steadview in May 2020.

In October 2020, the company launched Nykaa Man, India's first multi-brand ecommerce store for men's grooming. The company expanded into fashion by launching Nykaa Design Studio, which was renamed to Nykaa Fashion.

In November 2020, global asset management firm Fidelity invested in the company through a secondary sale of shares from an existing equity investor.

In December 2020, Nykaa Fashion launched its first store in Delhi, making the fashion business omnichannel.

Nykaa opened its initial public offering (IPO) on 28 October 2021. The IPO raised  at a valuation of 7.4 billion. Nykaa was publicly listed on the NSE and BSE on 10 November 2021, and its price rose by 89.2% on opening day, valuing the company at nearly 13 billion. Founder Falguni Nayar, who owned a 53.5% stake in the company, became India's wealthiest self-made female billionaire on the listing day.

Operations and services

Nykaa follows an inventory-based model with warehouses in Mumbai, New Delhi, Pune, Haryana, Kolkata and Bangalore. In 2020, in addition to its primary ecommerce business, it has an offline presence via 76 brick-and-mortar stores across the country. It claims to have over 200,000 products across 2,000 brands.

It has three offline store formats called Nykaa Luxe, Nykaa On Trend and Nykaa beauty Kiosks. The Luxe format features international luxury beauty brands such as Huda Beauty, MAC, Dior, and Givenchy along with Nykaa Beauty, the in-house collection of beauty products. The Nykaa On Trend format has products curated by category basis their popularity. In India, Nykaa is the only retailer that sells international brands like e.l.f, Charlotte Tilbury, Tonymoly, Becca, Sigma, Limecrime, Dermalogica, and Murad.

House of brands
Nykaa has a series of in-house brands within beauty and fashion. Some of them include:

 Nykaa House of Brands  – Nykaa Naturals, Nykaa Cosmetics, Kay Beauty
 Nykaa Fashion – Nykd by Nykaa, 20 Dresses, RSVP, Mondano, Likha, Pipa Bella

In 2015, Nykaa launched its collection of in-house beauty products via Nykaa Cosmetics and later expanded it across categories of Eyes, Nails, Face, Lips. The Nykaa Naturals portfolio is a collection of skincare and personal care products. In early 2019, the brand launched its Wanderlust Bath & Body collection, and later in the year introduced a beauty line with the iconic designer Masaba Gupta, Masaba by Nykaa. The same year, it launched its first celebrity partnership brand, Kay Beauty, with actress Katrina Kaif.

Acquisitions 
In May 2019, Nykaa acquired 20Dresses.com, a private women's styling platform.

In 2021, Nykaa Fashion acquired the India fashion jewellery brand, Pipa Bella  and the Indian skincare brand, Dot & Key.

In 2022, Nykaa acquired an 18.51% stake in Indian skincare brand Earth Rhythm. It then completed the 100% acquisition of lifestyle content platform Little Black Book (LBB).

Content platforms 
Nykaa also hosts beauty and fashion content via Nykaa TV, its YouTube channel. It contains informational videos about beauty, cosmetics, and styling. Some of its notable campaigns include #BreakTheHashtag (with Tapsee Pannu), #WhatMakesYourBeautiful (with acid attack survivor and activist Laxmi Agarwal), Beauty in Her Story (in collaboration with Netflix), web series Tinderella, Khoj (a Mother's Day film), and Rakshak (a Raksha Bandhan special film).

Since 2018, it has been hosting an online community of beauty and fashion enthusiasts via its Nykaa Network. In 2020, it launched a web miniseries called The Beauty Bar. Nykaa also hosts Beauty Book, a beauty and fashion magazine.

Other activities 
Since 2015, Nykaa has hosted the ‘Nykaa Femina Beauty Awards’ in partnership with women's lifestyle magazine Femina (India).

In 2019, Nykaa Fashion launched ‘The Power List’ in partnership with Vogue India.

Corporate social responsibility 
Nykaa extends social and financial help to causes such as education, health, women's rights and empowerment, rural development, and disaster management. Some of its notable CSR partnerships are with SPARSH India, CARE International Confederation, PRIDE, Milaap, Nanhi Kali, Make a Wish Foundation, Benefactory, Sneha, GiveIndia, and PM CARES Fund.

Criticism

Security issues
On 18 November 2019, an API flaw was detected in Nykaa Fashion's internal systems that allowed a potential attacker to log in to any user account if the attacker had access to the user's email ID. Consequently, the company fixed the security vulnerability.

Corporate governance
In November 2022, Nykaa issued 5:1 bonus shares to coincide with the expiry date of pre-IPO shareholders' lock-in period. The bonus issue resulted in the company's corporate governance practices receiving heavy criticism, with questions raised over the timing and motive of the issuance along with concerns of market manipulation and tax avoidance. Later that month, CFO Arvind Agarwal resigned from the company, even as the Securities and Exchange Board of India began scrutinizing the allotment of bonus shares.

In February 2023, defending the bonus share issuance, CEO Falguni Nayar, a former investment banker, claimed that the company had "assumed shareholders would be able to start trading the bonus shares within 4-5 days of the shareholder voting on the issue."

See also 
Ecommerce in India
MyGlamm

References

External links

Indian companies established in 2012
Beauty organisations
Online retailers of India
2021 initial public offerings
Companies listed on the Bombay Stock Exchange
Companies listed on the National Stock Exchange of India
Companies based in Mumbai
Indian brands